This is a list of international healthcare accreditation organizations.  These organizations are responsible for the accreditation of hospitals and other healtchcare services.  The Joint Commission is one of the most widely used accreditation organizations. The International Society for the Quality in Healthcare (ISQua) is the umbrella organization responsible for accrediting the Joint Commission accreditation scheme in the US and Accreditation Canada International, as well as accreditation organizations in the United Kingdom and Australia.  Many countries have either voluntary or mandatory accreditation requirements.

Organizations
The following is a list of hospital accreditation organizations grouped by country:

Africa
Ministries of health in several sub-Saharan African countries, including Zambia, Uganda, and South African, were reported to have begun planning health system reform including hospital accreditation before 2002.  However, most hospitals in Africa are administered by local health ministries or missionary organizations without accreditation programs.
USAID Applying Science to Strengthen and Improve Systems (ASSIST)
University Research Company, LLC

Algeria
Ministry of Health, Population and Hospital Reform

Australia
 Australian Council on Healthcare Standards International (ACHSI)
 Australian General Practice Accreditation Limited (AGPAL) 
 Australian Commission on Safety and Quality in Health Care (ACSQHC) uses standards developed by the National Safety and Quality Health Service Standards (NSQHS Standards) 
 Australian Council for Healthcare Standards International (ACHSI), based in Australia

Bosnia
 Srpska Agency for Accreditation and Quality, part of the Ministry of Health of Bosnia

Brazil
Associação Congregação de Santa Catarina (ACSC), established in 1900

Canada
 Accreditation Canada (AC), formerly known as Canadian Council on Health Services Accreditation, or CCHSA  - based in Canada

China
National Health Commission
National Administration of Traditional Chinese Medicine

Denmark
Department of Quality and Accreditation in the Health Service (IKAS)

Europe
 Organisation of European Cancer Institutes (OECI) Accreditation and Designation Programme (AC)

Egypt
General Authority for Healthcare Accreditation and Regulation (GAHAR)

France
 Haute Autorité de Santé (HAS), Accreditation mandatory since 1996.

Germany
Cooperation for Transparency and Quality in Hospitals (KTQ), accreditation is voluntary

India
 National Accreditation Board for Hospitals & Healthcare Providers (NABH)
Quality and Accreditation Institute (QAI). http://www.qai.org.in
National Quality Assurance Program (NQAS)
LaQshya
Kayakalp

Indonesia
Komisi Akreditasi Rumah Sakit (KARS)

Japan
Japan Council for Quality Health Care

Jordan
Health Care Accreditation Council (HCAC), non-profit established in 2007

Kazakhstan
Center for Accreditation for Quality in Healthcar

Latin America
Brazil, Argentina, and Chile were engaged in a hospital accreditation program in the 1990s in collaboration with PAHO.
Pan American Health Organization (PAHO)

Lithuania
VALSTYBINĖ AKREDITAVIMO SVEIKATOS PRIEŽIŪROS VEIKLAI TARNYBA (English:  State Health Care Accreditation Agency) (VASPVT)

Malaysia
 Malaysian Society for Quality in Health (MSQH)

Mexico
As of 2009, Mexico signed an agreement with the Joint Commission of Accreditation of Health Care Organizations, now the Joint Commission to adopt U.S. hospital standards for accreditation.

Netherlands
Nederlands Instituut voor Accreditatie in de Zorg (NIAZ)

New Zealand
Designated Audit Agency (DAA) Group provides accreditation to health services in NZ  The DAA Group is accredited by the international umbrella organization, the International Society for Quality in Healthcare (ISQua).
Quality Health New Zealand (QHNZ)

North Macedonia
Agency for Quality and Accreditation of Health Institutions of the Republic of Northern Macedonia, established in 2013

Norway
 DNV GL, based in Norway and the United States

Peru
Acreditas Global (formerly AAAHC International) has been present in Peru and Costa Rica since 2012.

Portugal
Andalusian Agency for Healthcare Quality (ACSA)

Romania
 National Authority of Quality Management in Health (ANMCS), based in Bucharest, Romania

Saudi Arabia
 Saudi Central Board for Accreditation of Healthcare Institutions (CBAHI), Jeddah.

Serbia
Agency for Accreditation of Health Institutions of Serbia (AZUS), established in 2008

South Africa
Office of Health Standards Compliance (OHSC)
The Council  of Health Service Accreditation of Southern Africa

South Korea
Korea Institute for Healthcare Accreditation (KOIHA)

Taiwan
Taiwan Joint Commission on Hospital Accreditation (財團法人醫院評鑑暨醫療品質策進會) - based in Taipei

Thailand
 Healthcare Accreditation Institute (Public Organisation), based in Bangkok, Thailand

Tonga
Instance National d'Evaluation et de l'Accréditation en Sante (INEAS)

Turkey
 Standards of Accreditation in Health (SAS), Ministry of Health (Turkey)

United Kingdom

 QHA Trent Accreditation
 United Kingdom Accreditation Forum (UKAF), responsible for accrediting accreditation schemes in the United Kingdom 
 CHKS Ltd is a specialist provider of healthcare accreditation programmes based in the UK and accredited to ISQua and ISO 17021:2011 standards

United States

Hospital accreditation is required in order to be eligible for Medicare patient coverage.
Accreditation Commission for Health Care (ACHC) International
Accreditation Association for Ambulatory Health Care (AAAHC) - based in the United States
American Accreditation Commission International (AACI) - based in the United States 
Community Health Accreditation Program.
Det Norske Veritas (DNV)
Global Healthcare Accreditation (GHA)
Healthcare Facilities Accreditation Program (HFAP)
Healthcare Quality Association on Accreditation (HQAA)
 Joint Commission also known as Joint Commission International (JCI)
National Dialysis Accreditation Commission (NDAC)
The Compliance Team

See also
Hospital accreditation
International healthcare accreditation
Medical ethics
Lists of hospitals

References

International Healthcare Accreditation
International Healthcare Accreditation
International Healthcare Accreditation